Ovidiu Oprea (born 10 September 1976) is a Romanian cyclist. He competed in the men's cross-country mountain biking event at the 2004 Summer Olympics.

References

1976 births
Living people
Romanian male cyclists
Olympic cyclists of Romania
Cyclists at the 2004 Summer Olympics
People from Târnăveni